Azcárate is a Spanish and Basque surname, common in Navarra and Guipúzcoa.   The name may mean "High, rocky mountain pass."   Azcárate is also found in Mexico City, Chihuahua, and Coahuila.  Also spelled Escarate and Ascarate.  Notable people with this surname include:

 Federico Azcárate (born 1984), Argentine footballer
 Gumersindo de Azcárate (1840–1917), Spanish philosopher 
 Juan Francisco Azcárate (1896–1987), Mexican military figure and TNCA aircraft designer
 Juan Francisco Azcárate y Ledesma (1760–1814), Mexican lawyer
 Justino de Azcárate (1903–1989), Spanish lawyer and politician
 Manuel Azcárate 1916–1998), Spanish journalist and politician
 Pablo de Azcárate (1890–1971), Spanish diplomat
 Penney S. Azcarate, American judge

Basque-language surnames